The gilded flicker (Colaptes chrysoides) is a large-sized woodpecker (mean length of ) of the Sonoran, Yuma, and eastern Colorado Desert regions of the southwestern United States and northwestern Mexico, including all of Baja California, except the extreme northwestern region. Yellow underwings distinguish the gilded flicker from the northern flicker found within the same region, which has red underwings.

Taxonomy
Four subspecies are recognized:
 The Cape gilded flicker (C. c. chrysoides) resides in southern Baja California.
 The brown gilded flicker (C. c. brunnescens) resides in northern and central Baja California.
 Mearns' gilded flicker (C. c. mearnsi) resides in extreme southeastern California to Arizona and northwestern Mexico.
 The Mexican gilded flicker (C. c. tenebrosus) resides in northwestern Mexico from northern Sonora to northern Sinaloa.

Habitat
The gilded flicker most frequently builds its nest hole in a saguaro cactus, excavating a nest hole nearer to the top than to the ground. The cactus defends itself against water loss into the cavity of the nesting hole by secreting sap that hardens into a waterproof structure that is known as a saguaro boot. Northern flickers, on the other hand, nest in riparian trees and very rarely inhabit saguaros. Gilded flickers occasionally hybridize with northern flickers in the narrow zones where their ranges and habitats overlap.

References

Gallery

Further reading
 Corman, T. E., Wise-Gervais, C. Arizona Breeding Bird Atlas. Albuquerque:  University of New Mexico Press. (2005) .
 National Geographic Society Field Guide to the Birds of North America, Third Edition. Washington, D.C.: National Geographic Society. (1999) .

External links

Gilded flicker photo gallery VIREO
Photo-High Res; Article borderland-tours
Photo-High Res; Article tsuru-bird.net

Gilded flicker
Birds of Mexico
Fauna of the Sonoran Desert
Native birds of the Southwestern United States
Taxa named by Alfred Malherbe
Birds described in 1845